Rajput painting, also called Rajasthan painting, evolved and flourished in the royal courts of Rajputana in northern India, mainly during the 17th century. Artists trained in the tradition of the Mughal miniature were dispersed from the imperial Mughal court and developed styles also drawing from local traditions of painting, especially those illustrating the Hindu religious epics, the Mahabharata and Ramayana.

Subjects varied, but portraits of the ruling family, often engaged in hunting or their daily activities, were generally popular, as were narrative scenes from the epics or Hindu mythology, as well as some genre scenes of unnamed people.
 
The colors were extracted from certain minerals, plant sources, and conch shells, and were even derived by processing precious stones. Gold and silver were used. The preparation of desired colors was a lengthy process, sometimes taking up to two weeks. Traditionally, fine brushes were the norm.

Content 
While there exist a plethora of themes in Rajput paintings, a common motif found throughout Rajput works is the purposeful manipulation of space. In particular, the inclusion of fuller spaces is meant to emphasize a lack of boundaries and inseparability of characters and landscapes. In this way, the individuality of physical characters is almost rejected, allowing both the depicted backgrounds and human figures to be equally expressive.

Outside of a purely artistic standpoint, Rajput paintings were often politically charged and commented on social values of the time. Mewar rulers wanted these painting to portray their ambitions and establish their legacy. Therefore, paintings were often indicative of a ruler's legacy or their changes made to better society.

Both of these factors clearly distinguish Rajput paintings from Mughal works. While from a chronological standpoint, both of these cultures clashed with one another, Rajput paintings only superficially adopted Mughal fashion and cultural standards. Elements such as precise likenesses in portraiture, utilized by popular Mughal artists (e.g., Govhardhan, Hashim, etc.), are not found in Rajput work. Likewise, Rajput techniques are not predominantly seen in Mughal paintings. As art historian Milo Beach puts it, "at the opening of the eighteenth century, ... Rajput painting remains recognizably different in intent from traditional Mughal attitudes".

Schools 

In the late 16th century, Rajput art schools began to develop distinctive styles, combining indigenous as well as foreign influences such as Persian, Mughal, Chinese and European. Rajasthani painting consists of four principal schools that have within them several artistic styles and substyles that can be traced to the various princely states that patronised these artists. The four principal schools are:
 The Mewar school, with the Chavand, Nathdwara, Devgarh, Udaipur and Sawar styles of painting
 The Marwar school, with the Kishangarh, Bikaner, Jodhpur, Nagaur, Pali and Ghanerao styles of painting
 The Hadoti school, with the Kota, Bundi and Jhalawar styles of painting
 The Dhundar school, with the Amber, Jaipur, Shekhawati and Uniara styles of painting.

See also

 Dalchand, an 18th-century Rajput artist
 Mughal painting
 Tanjore painting
 Sikh art

Notes

References
 Beach, M, (1992). 1700–1800: The Dominance of Rajput Painting. In Mughal and Rajput Painting (The New Cambridge History of India, pp. 174–213). Cambridge: Cambridge University Press. doi:10.1017/CHOL9780521400275.008
Kossak, Steven. (1997). Indian court painting, 16th-19th century. Metropolitan Museum of Art.

Further reading
 The City Palace Museum, Udaipur: paintings of Mewar court life. by Andrew Topsfield, Pankaj Shah, Government Museum, Udaipur. Mapin, 1990. .
 Splendour of Rajasthani painting, by Jai Singh Neeraj. Abhinav Publications, 1991. .
Art and artists of Rajasthan: a study on the art & artists of Mewar with reference to western Indian school of painting, by Radhakrishna Vashistha. Abhinav Publications, 1995. .
 A study of Bundi school of painting, by Jiwan Sodhi. Abhinav Publications, 1999. 
 Court painting at Udaipur: art under the patronage of the Maharanas of Mewar, by Andrew Topsfield, Museum Rietberg. Artibus Asiae Publishers, 2001. .
 Rajput Painting, by Ananda K. Coomaraswamy, Publisher	B. R. Publishing Corporation, 2003. .
 The artists of Nathadwara: the practice of painting in Rajasthan, by Tryna Lyons. Indiana University Press, 2004. .
 Ghosh, P. (2012). The Intelligence of Tradition in Rajput Court Painting. Art Bulletin, 94(4), 650–652.
Dalrymple, William, (2016).  The beautiful, magical world of Rajput art.] New York Review of Books, 26 November 2016.

External links
 Indian medieval painting schools - Rajput painting

Rajasthani arts
Schools of Indian painting
Illuminated manuscripts